Ljubomir Ćipranić (9 April 1936 – 24 December 2010) was a Serbian actor. He appeared in over 160 films and television shows since 1959. He starred in the 1967 film The Rats Woke Up, which won the Silver Bear for Best Director at the 17th Berlin International Film Festival.

Selected filmography
 The Rats Woke Up (1967)
 Tigar (1978)
 Migrations (1988)

References

External links

1936 births
2010 deaths
Serbian male film actors
People from Gevgelija Municipality
Serbian male television actors